The 2012 Men's Asian Champions Trophy was the second edition of the Men's Asian Champions Trophy. The tournament was held from 20 to 27 December 2012 in Doha, Qatar. The top six Asian teams (India, Oman, Pakistan, China, Malaysia and Japan) participated in the tournament, which involved round-robin league among all teams followed by play-offs for final positions.

India entered the tournament as the defending champion, but lost to Pakistan in the final by a score of 5-4.

Teams

Fixtures
All times are Arabia Standard Time (UTC+3)

Round robin

Classification round

Fifth place game

Third place game

Final

Statistics

Final standings

Goalscorers

References

External links
2012 Asian Men's Hockey Champions Trophy, Doha (official website)

Men's Asian Champions Trophy
International field hockey competitions hosted by Qatar
Asian Champions Trophy
Asian Champions Trophy
Asian Champions Trophy
Sports competitions in Doha
21st century in Doha